Louis-Étienne Ricard (July 10, 1740 – January 6, 1814) was a French politician who served as an MP for Gard during the French Revolution.

References

External links 
 Biographical details on the National Assembly's site

1740 births
1814 deaths
Politicians from Marseille
Members of the National Constituent Assembly (France)